Ashan Madhushanka (born 6 December 1996) is a Sri Lankan cricketer.

He made his first-class debut for Galle Cricket Club in Tier B of the 2018–19 Premier League Tournament on 8 April 2019, his Twenty20 debut for Galle Cricket Club in the 2018–19 SLC Twenty20 Tournament on 15 February 2019 and his List A debut for Galle Cricket Club in the 2018–19 Premier Limited Overs Tournament on 10 March 2019.

References

External links
 

1996 births
Living people
Sri Lankan cricketers
Galle Cricket Club cricketers
Place of birth missing (living people)